The New Year's Six, sometimes abbreviated as NY6, is an unofficial but commonly used term used to describe the following NCAA Division I Football Bowl Subdivision (FBS) bowl games: the Rose Bowl, Sugar Bowl, Orange Bowl, Cotton Bowl, Peach Bowl, and Fiesta Bowl. These games are played annually on or around New Year's Day and represent six of the ten oldest bowl games played at the FBS level.

These six top-tier bowl games rotate the hosting of the two College Football Playoff (CFP) semifinal games, which determine the teams that play in the final College Football Playoff National Championship game. The rotation is set on a three-year cycle with the following pairings: Rose–Sugar, Orange–Cotton, and Peach-Fiesta. The National Championship game may be considered part of the New Year's Six, depending on context. When the college Football expands to 12 teams in 2024, the New Year's Six will host the Quarterfinal and Semifinal rounds.

Using the final CFP rankings, the selection committee seeds and pairs the top four teams and determines the participants for the other four non-playoff New Year's Six bowls that are not hosting the semifinals that year. These four non-playoff bowls are also referred to as the Selection Committee bowl games. These 6 games focus on the top 12 teams in the rankings; to date during the College Football Playoff era (2014–2020 football seasons), only 9 of the 84 teams selected by the committee have been ranked lower than 12th.

Overall, 12 teams are selected each football season for these major, top-tier bowls. These are required to include the champions of the "Power Five" conferences (ACC, Big Ten, Big 12, Pac-12, and SEC). In addition, the highest-ranked champion from the "Group of Five" conferences (The American, Conference USA, MAC, Mountain West, and Sun Belt) is guaranteed a berth if the group's top team is not in the playoff.

History leading to the creation of the CFP
The Bowl Championship Series (BCS) was a selection system that created five bowl game match-ups involving ten of the top ranked teams in the NCAA Division I Football Bowl Subdivision (FBS) of college football, including an opportunity for the top two teams to compete in the BCS National Championship Game. The system was in place for the 1998 through 2013 seasons and in 2014 was replaced by the College Football Playoff. The four-team playoffs consist of two semifinal games, with the winners advancing to the College Football Playoff National Championship. If New Year's Day falls on a Sunday, the traditional New Year's Day games are played on January 2 in deference to the National Football League's week 17 games.

In June 2012, the BCS conference presidents approved the College Football Playoff to replace the Bowl Championship Series. Three bowls—Rose, Sugar, and Orange—because of their contracts with Power 5 conferences, were selected to be part of the rotating semifinal playoff games, with three more bowls to be named. Because of issues about fairness and the Big East's BCS Automatic Qualifier conference status, conference commissioners began to consider accommodating the Group of Five leagues with a seventh participating bowl. On November 12, 2012, in Denver, the conference commissioners granted the top Group of Five conference champion a guaranteed slot in one of the six premier bowls. In July 2013, the Cotton Bowl Classic, the Fiesta Bowl, and the Chick-fil-A Peach Bowl were selected as the other three rotating semifinal playoff bowls ahead of the Holiday Bowl. Also, the BCS conference commissioners meetings selected Cowboys Stadium as the first host of the College Football Playoff Championship Game on January 12, 2015.

Bowl game conference tie-ins
Three of the bowls have tie-ins with the specified conference champions in the years they are not hosting playoff semifinals:

 Rose Bowl: Big Ten vs. Pac-12
 Sugar Bowl: SEC vs. Big 12
 Orange Bowl: ACC vs. Big Ten, SEC, or Notre Dame

When the conference champion is unavailable, the bowls invite the next-best team from that conference. The Cotton, Fiesta, and Peach Bowls have no conference tie-ins; as such, the best conference champion from the Group of Five will play in one of those bowls if it does not qualify for the CFP semifinal.

History and schedule
Games are listed in chronological order, with final CFP rankings, and win–loss records prior to the respective bowl being played.

2014 season

2015 season

2016 season

2017 season

2018 season

2019 season

Source:

2020 season

Source:

2021 season

2022 season

Future games
Starting with the 2024-25 season, with the expansion of the College Football Playoff, the four games not hosting the national semi-finals will instead host the national quarterfinals. While the Rose Bowl Game is contractually obligated to still be held on New Year's Day, the timing of the other three quarterfinals remains TBA. At least one other quarterfinal is expected to take place on New Year's Day. 

 Denotes CFP semifinal games
Source:

New Year's Six bowl appearances

New Year's Six performance

New Year's Six bowl appearances by team

+ Denotes CFP Semifinal

New Year's Six bowl appearances by conference

Conference USA and Sun Belt Conference have never appeared in the New Year's Six.  * In 2020, Notre Dame played as part of the ACC due to COVID-19

College Football Playoff appearances and performances

College Football Playoff performance

College Football Playoff National Championship appearances

College Football Playoff National Championship appearances by team

College Football Playoff National Championship appearances by conference

See also

College football national championships in NCAA Division I FBS
Plus-One system

References

External links
  

College Football Playoff